The 1966 South Carolina gubernatorial election was held on November 8, 1966 to select the governor of the state of South Carolina, USA. It marked the first time since the gubernatorial election of 1938 that the Democratic candidate faced opposition from a Republican candidate. Governor Robert Evander McNair prevailed as the winner of the election and continued as the 108th governor of South Carolina, but Joseph O. Rogers, Jr. had a respectable showing for the first Republican candidate in 28 years.

Primaries
Both Governor McNair and Joseph O. Rogers, Jr. faced no opposition in their party's primaries which allowed both candidates to concentrate solely on the general election.

General election
The general election was held on November 8, 1966 and Robert Evander McNair was elected to continue his term as governor of South Carolina. Turnout was the highest for any gubernatorial election since because it was the first time in 90 years that there was a competitive gubernatorial election.

 
 

|-
| 
| colspan=5 |Democratic hold
|-

See also
Governor of South Carolina
List of governors of South Carolina
South Carolina gubernatorial elections

References
"Supplemental Report of the Secretary of State to the General Assembly of South Carolina." Reports and Resolutions of South Carolina to the General Assembly of the State of South Carolina. Volume II. Columbia, South Carolina: 1967, p. 18.

External links
SCIway Biography of Governor Robert Evander McNair

1966
1966 United States gubernatorial elections
Gubernatorial
November 1966 events in the United States